Tom Bayley Sanders (born 5 February 1994) is a New Zealand rugby union player who currently plays as a loose forward for  in New Zealand's domestic Mitre 10 Cup and the Crusaders in the international Super Rugby competition. He also plays as a Number 8 position.

Early career

Born in Christchurch and raised in the small town of Little River, Sanders attended Lincoln High School in the city of his birth, where he played first XV rugby for 3 years and was a member of the New Zealand Schools academy during that time.   He initially played his rugby as a midfielder, but later in his teens switched to loose forward.

After graduating high school, he began studying for a Bachelor of Commerce in Agricultural Management at Lincoln University while also representing them in the local Canterbury club leagues.

Senior career

Sanders started out his senior career with Canterbury during the 2014 ITM Cup, making his debut against  in Week 1 of the competition. He had to settle for a place on the replacements bench most weeks but did come on to good effect and scored 3 tries in 8 appearances during the season. Injury held him back in the early part of 2016, but he bounced back to start 7 times and score 1 try to help Canterbury to their 8th national provincial championship title in 9 seasons.

Super Rugby

His displays in his first year of provincial rugby didn't go unnoticed and he was named as a member of the  wider training group for the 2015 Super Rugby season.   It was largely a season of learning for Sanders, as the presence of All Black stalwarts such as Kieran Read and Richie McCaw in the Crusaders back row meant that he didn't see any game time.

His continued good work in New Zealand's domestic rugby competitions saw him  named in the  squad in 2016. He was retained in the squad for 2017.

International career

Sanders was a surprise inclusion in the New Zealand Under-20 side which competed in the 2014 IRB Junior World Championship in his home country.   Despite this, he was one of the standout loose forwards in the competition and scored 1 try in 4 appearances as his side finished in 3rd place.   During his time at Lincoln University, he also represented the New Zealand Universities team.

Career Honours

Canterbury

Mitre 10 Cup Premiership - 2015, 2016

Super Rugby Statistics

References

1994 births
New Zealand rugby union players
Canterbury rugby union players
Rugby union flankers
Rugby union number eights
Living people
Chiefs (rugby union) players
People educated at Lincoln High School, New Zealand
Lincoln University (New Zealand) alumni
Rugby union players from Christchurch
Crusaders (rugby union) players
Tokyo Sungoliath players